Abdullah Al-Dahdouh (1966 Tangier, Morocco –13 March 2012 Brussels, Belgium) was a Muslim scholar from Morocco. He established the Islamic Center of Imam Reza in Brussels, Belgium.

Biography
Al-Dahdouh was born in Tangier, Morocco in 1966. Hailing from the Sunni family, he decided to go to Qom in 1980 to continue his religious education in the Hawza of Qom.

Death

Al-Dahdouh was murdered in an unprovoked attack by a Moroccan Sunni in the Islamic Center of Imam Reza in Brussels, Belgium on 13 March 2012.

External links 

 Sheikh Abdullah Dohdaweh - The Enlightened to Shia Islam Centre
 sheikh abdullah dohdaweh - wikishia (in persian)

References

1966 births
2012 deaths
Moroccan emigrants to Belgium
Moroccan Shia Muslims
Belgian Shia Muslims
Converts to Shia Islam from Sunni Islam
Critics of Sunni Islam
Moroccan murder victims
People murdered in Belgium